Ben Hollingsworth (born June 6, 1982) is an American former soccer player who currently works as an artist.

External links
 Player profile at Charleston Battery
 Self-Made: A Portrait of the Artist as a Young Man
 
 

1982 births
Living people
American soccer players
Charleston Battery players
People from Mount Pleasant, South Carolina
Soccer players from South Carolina
College of Charleston Cougars men's soccer players
Association football midfielders